A toque ( or ) is a type of hat with a narrow brim or no brim at all.

Toques were popular from the 13th to the 16th century in Europe, especially France. The mode was revived in the 1930s. Now it is primarily known as the traditional headgear for professional cooks, except in Canada where the term toque is primarily used for knit caps.

Name 

The word toque has been known in English since around 1500. It is a loan word from the French  (15th century), presumably by the way of the Spanish  'woman's headdress', from Arabic  طاقة, itself from Old Persian  'veil, shawl'.

The word  in Breton means 'hat'. Old Breton spells the word .

History and uses
A tall, black toque made of silk or velvet, often ornamented with an aigrette, was fashionable among the Spanish nobility during the 1500s. This style is seen in a 1584 portrait of Isabella Clara Eugenia as well as  Sofonisba Anguissola's 1573 portrait of Philip II of Spain, both in the Museo del Prado. The style spread across Europe, being adopted in France, England, Germany, and Italy. The toque diminished in popularity in the 1600s as wide-brimmed and cocked hats became fashionable, but reappeared as a predominantly young women's fashion in the 1800s, accompanying long dresses and chignon hairstyles.

Culinary

A  (French for 'white hat'), often shortened to toque, is a tall, round, pleated, starched white hat worn by chefs.

The toque most likely originated as the result of the gradual evolution of head coverings worn by cooks throughout the centuries. Their roots are sometimes traced to the casque à meche (stocking cap) worn by 18th-century French chefs. The colour of the casque à meche denoted the rank of the wearer. Boucher, the personal chef of the French statesman Talleyrand, was the first to insist on white toques for sanitary reasons.

The modern toque is popularly believed to have originated with the French chef Marie-Antoine Carême (1784–1833), who stiffened  the casque à meche with cardboard .

Judicial
 A toque, or sometimes touge, was the traditional headgear of various French magistrates.
 A low type in black velvet, called mortier (also rendered in English as mortarboard), was used by the président à mortier, president of a parlement (the royal highest court in a French province), and of the members of two of the highest central courts, cour de cassation and cour des comptes.
 A red toque is sometimes worn by German judges, primarily by justices on the Federal Constitutional Court.

Academic
The pleated, low, round hat worn in French universities the equivalent of the mortarboard or tam at British and American universities is also called a toque.

Heraldic

In the Napoleonic era, the French first empire replaced the coronets of traditional ("royal") heraldry with a rigorously standardized system (as other respects of "Napoleonic" coats of arms) of toques, reflecting the rank of the bearer. Thus a Napoleonic duke used a toque with seven ostrich feathers and three lambrequins, a count a toque with five feathers and two lambrequins, a baron three feathers and one lambrequin, a knight only one ostrich feather (see Nobility of the First French Empire).

Athletic
Toque is also used for a hard-type hat or helmet, worn for riding, especially in equestrian sports, often black and covered with black velvet.

Knit cap

In Canada, tuque  is the common name for a knitted winter hat, or watch cap; the spelling touque, although not recognized by the Canadian Oxford Dictionary, is also sometimes seen in written English. The Canadian-English term was assimilated from Canadian-French word tuque, and first appeared in writing around 1870.

Such hats are known in other English-speaking countries by a variety of names, including beanie, watch cap or stocking cap; the terms tuque and toque are unique to Canada and northern areas of the United States close to the Canada–United States border.

In 2013, CBC Edmonton launched a poll to ask viewers how they spelled the word. The options given were toque, tuque or touque. Nearly 6,500 people voted, with Edmontonians remaining divided on the issue.

In recent years knit toques have resurfaced as an extremely popular fashion item, they are used all year round, seen not only used outdoors for weather but as an indoor fashion accessory. Many toques are used to promote or advertise as items of Canadian memorabilia, i.e. Canadian NHL hockey teams, Canadian provinces and cities, and many more popular culture artifacts.

See also

 List of hats
 List of headgear

 Similar hats
 Capotain
 Fez (hat)
 Kalimavkion
 Kofia (hat)
 Kolpik
 Kufi
 Skufia
 Smoking cap
 Tam
 Taqiyah (cap)

Notes

References 
 EtymologyOnLine
 Heraldry.org Napoleonic heraldry

External links

Index to French Heraldry

Academic dress
Canadian fashion
Cooking
French heraldry
Hats
History of clothing (Western fashion)
History of fashion
Judicial clothing
Sportswear
Winter clothes